Chenggao is an ancient city in present-day Sishui, which is under the jurisdiction of Xingyang City in Henan Province, People's Republic of China.

References
Romance of the Three Kingdoms/Chapter 4

Cities in Henan